Mindbenders  is a 2004 science fiction-thriller feature film written and directed by Anthony Wayne Pettus, who also produced the film.

Cast
Tomiko Martinez as Elle
Jennifer Goodrich as Mia
Nicole Turner as Ciccy
Ann Marie Camlin as Erica
James Phelan as Ravel Troutman
Mauro L. Metini as Number One
R.J. Frost as Number Three
J. Wells as Number Two
LaVan Davis as Leroy
Alex Castro as Hakeem
Brandi Cohen as Saleswoman
Bryan Frank as J.J.
Jack Monroe as Mugger
J.J. Valera as Momo

External links 
 

2004 films
2000s thriller films
2000s English-language films
American thriller films
2000s American films